Ann Mary Devroy (9 October 1948 – 23 October 1997) was an American political journalist. She was a White House correspondent for 15 years, for the Gannett Company, USA Today (1979–1985), and The Washington Post (1989–1997). She covered four presidents including Jimmy Carter, Ronald Reagan, George H. W. Bush and Bill Clinton, and 10 White House chiefs of staff.

Life and career
Ann Mary Devroy was born October 9, 1948, in Green Bay, Wisconsin. While she was a journalism student at the University of Wisconsin–Eau Claire, she interned at the Milwaukee Journal and worked as a reporter for the Eau Claire Leader-Telegram. After she received her bachelor's degree in 1970, Devroy began working for the Courier News, a New Jersey newspaper owned by the Gannett Company. In 1977, she moved to Gannett's Washington bureau. She covered Congress for two years before becoming White House correspondent for Gannett and its new national newspaper, USA Today.

In 1985, Devroy joined The Washington Post as political editor on the national news desk—a job that would allow her to spend more time with her young daughter. As deputy national editor, Devroy directed coverage of the 1988 Presidential campaign. In 1989, she returned to the White House beat. Andrew Rosenthal of The New York Times, who was Devroy's main competition, described her as "the scariest and most generous reporter I've ever known. She would kick your butt 24 hours a day."

She was also a prolific reporter. Over 2,300 stories carrying Ann Devroy's byline appeared in The Post from 1989 through 1995.

Devroy was not part of the Washington TV punditocracy. She turned down frequent requests to appear on camera participating in press panels. Devroy made a rare television appearance as Tim Russert's guest on his CNBC show March 28, 1994.

As a cost-saving measure, The Post once floated the idea of ending expensive press charter flights to out-of-town presidential events,  proposing instead that its reporters fly commercial. Devroy fired off a response concluding that the short-sighted move to economize "diminishes our commitment to White House coverage ... and erodes a lesson I have spent a career beating into every White House I cover: Don't screw with The Post. When no one else pays attention, we do."

"Ann Devroy was the toughest and fairest White House reporter I knew," said George Stephanopoulos, senior adviser to President Clinton in his first term. "She knew when she had a story, and she knew when to kill one. She revered the office of the presidency and the role that reporters play in keeping it honest."

In May 1994, Devroy received a journalism award from the Gerald R. Ford Foundation, for distinguished reporting on the presidency. She received the foundation's seventh annual prize for her articles on President Clinton's foreign policy and his effort to sell his domestic program, Vice President Al Gore's record and an evaluation of former president George H. W. Bush.

Devroy died at her home in Washington October 23, 1997, age 49, of uterine cancer. President Bill Clinton issued a statement that day on learning of her death: "For more than a decade, no journalist dominated and defined the White House beat with the kind of skill, shrewd analysis and gruff grace that Ann brought to her reporting."

Legacy
After Ann Devroy's death, The Washington Post created an annual journalism fellowship at the University of Wisconsin–Eau Claire. Featured speakers at the Ann Devroy Memorial Forum are listed below.

 1998: David S. Broder
 1999: David Maraniss 
 2000: Leonard Downie Jr. 
 2001: Gwen Ifill 
 2002: Karen DeYoung 
 2003: Lou Cannon 
 2004: Andrea Mitchell 
 2005: Mike McCurry 
 2006: Dana Milbank 
 2007: Robert G. Kaiser and Bob Woodward 
 2008: Dana Priest 
 2009: Dan Balz 
 2010: Helen Thomas 
 2011: E. J. Dionne 
 2012: Bob Edwards and Gene Weingarten 
 2013: Ruth Marcus 
 2014: Scott Wilson 
 2015: Al Kamen 
 2016: Terence Samuel 
 2017: Jenna Johnson 
 2018: Ashley Parker
 2019: Tracy Grant
 2021: Philip Rucker
 2022: Sharif Durhams

"Her reputation was one of fairness and accuracy, a gift for straight and impartial news reporting, and a tenacious pursuit of information," wrote Martha J. Kumar in The Harvard International Journal of Press/Politics. "Both in interest and in style, Ann Devroy was ideally suited to the White House beat. Devroy not only had the persistence required to strip the bark off the White House publicity tree, but she also possessed an avid interest in understanding the institution she covered, including the rhythms of its operations over time. ... Ann Devroy established a lasting standard of how the White House should be covered."

References

External links
 C-SPAN Video Library:
 Media Coverage of Clinton's First Year, March 15, 1994 (1 hour 38 minutes, with Charles Royer, Mark Gearan, Thomas Oliphant, Charles Peters, Margaret D. Tutwiler)
 White House Press Corps (vignette), April 26, 1993 (8 minutes, with Larry McQuillan, Helen Thomas, Brit Hume, Wolf Blitzer)
 News Discussion, May 7, 1985 (57 minutes, with Carl Rutan)
 War Powers Act, September 16, 1983 (60 minutes, with Brian Lamb)
 News Discussion, February 10, 1983 (50 minutes, with Bruce Collins)

1948 births
1997 deaths
American newspaper reporters and correspondents
Journalists from Wisconsin
Writers from Green Bay, Wisconsin
University of Wisconsin–Eau Claire alumni
The Washington Post people
American women journalists
20th-century American women writers
20th-century American non-fiction writers
Deaths from uterine cancer
Deaths from cancer in Washington, D.C.
20th-century American journalists